John James Guy  (born 1950 in Oxford) is a British educationalist.

He gained his first degree in Chemistry before becoming a Postdoctoral Research Fellow in X-ray Crystallography at Cambridge University.  He was a Chemistry teacher in various schools before securing his first headship at St Philip’s Sixth Form College in Birmingham in 1985.  He was appointed Principal in 1992 of the Sixth Form College, Farnborough, one of the first four Learning and Skills Beacon Colleges in the UK.

He is a board member of Oxford, Cambridge and RSA Examinations and Cambridge Assessment.  He has been a member of several government committees including the Tomlinson 14–19 Working Group.  He was Chair of the Assessment Sub-Group.  He serves on expert panels advising the Secretary of State on the development of the Children’s Plan and on the development of the Children’s Workforce. He is a member of the LSC External Advisory Group.  He was appointed an external governor of Oxford Brookes University in 2009. He was awarded the OBE for services to education in 2001. He is currently a member of the Education Honours Committee.

He lives in Oxford and is married with three sons.

References

1950 births
Living people
People from Camberley
Officers of the Order of the British Empire
British educational theorists